The Espirito Santo Trophy  (World Women's Amateur Team Championships) is a biennial world amateur team golf championship for women organised by the International Golf Federation.

The inaugural event was held in 1964. It was instituted by the French Golf Federation in an agreement with the United States Golf Association. It was planned by Lally Segard, at the time known as Vicomtesse de Saint Sauveur, from France and Mrs. Henri Prunaret from America. Segard also asked her friends Ricardo and Silvia Espirito Santo, from Portugal, to donate a trophy for the event, which they did. They had originally bought the golden cup, which had belonged to Tsar Nicholas II of Russia, for an international Portuguese event that was not played anymore. The championship was held under the chairmanship of Segard at Golf de Saint Germain outside Paris, France. The week after, the World Amateur Golf Council agreed to manage and sponsor the tournament, beginning in 1966, to be played every second year, and Segard was appointed chairperson of the women's committee of the council. The Council changed its name to the International Golf Federation in 2003.

Recent tournaments have featured teams from around 50 countries. It is a stroke play event, in which the best two individual scores in each team count towards the final score.

For the first three decades, the championship was dominated by the United States. Later results have reflected the increasing globalisation of women's golf, with six different winners in six events from 1996 to 2006, and several top two placings by teams from Asia. South Korea won four times from 1996 to 2016.

The equivalent "World Amateur Team Championship" for men is the Eisenhower Trophy.

Results

Results summary

Sources:

The "Great Britain & Ireland" team represented the two separate independent countries of the United Kingdom and the Republic of Ireland from 1966 to 2004. This is the designation of the team which plays the United States in the Curtis Cup. From 2006, England, Scotland, Wales, and Ireland (a combined Republic of Ireland and Northern Ireland team) have competed as separate teams.

Future sites
2023 Jumeirah Golf Estates, UAE
2025 Tanah Merah Country Club (Tampines Course), Singapore
2027 Royal Golf Dar Es Salam, Morocco

References

External links
More detailed results on the International Golf Federation's site

Espirito Santo Trophy
Women's golf tournaments
Recurring sporting events established in 1964